Tole may refer to:

People
 Afrim Tole (born 1970), Albanian football player
 Joseph Tole (1846–1920), New Zealand politician
 Shubha Tole (born 1967), Indian neuroscientist
 Tolé Madna (1898–1992), Indonesian soldier
 Tole Karadzic (born 1939), Montenegrin businessman
 Vasil Tole (born 1963), Albanian ethnomusicologist

Places
 Tolé, Panama
 Tole (woreda), Ethiopia

Other
 Tole painting